Chohung Bank Co., Ltd. (CHB) was a bank company headquartered in Seoul, South Korea. It is one of the oldest banks in Korea, having been established on February 1, 1897. Its first loan was against living donkey in same year. The bank was nationalized after Korea gained independence in 1945. It was privatised under the government of Syngman Rhee in 1950s, but renationalized in 1961 by new military government. It became one of the 5 largest commercial banks in South Korea, but fell under financial trouble in 1997 Asian financial crisis. Chohung merged with Shinhan Bank in April 2006. The merger was pushed by South Korean government to make economy of scale in banking industry

See also
Chohung Bank FC
List of banks in South Korea
Economy of South Korea
Shinhan Financial Group
Shinhan Bank

References 

Banks of South Korea